Fogarty is an unincorporated community in Logan County, Illinois, United States. Fogarty is located along Interstate 55 and a railroad line southwest of Lincoln.

References

Unincorporated communities in Logan County, Illinois
Unincorporated communities in Illinois